Mingo is a rural locality in the North Burnett Region, Queensland, Australia.

Geography 
The Burnett River passes through Mingo and forms its south-eastern boundary. The Gayndah Mount Perry Road provides north–south access through the locality.

Part of the Mount Rawdon open cut gold mine is in the northern part Mingo.

History 
The Mingo Provisional School opened in 1898 and closed in 1903.

Amenities 
There is a caravan and camping ground on the north-east bank of Burnett River off the Gayndah Mount Perry Road.

References 

North Burnett Region
Localities in Queensland